Isangano National Park is a national park in the Northern Province of Zambia. It covers an area of 840 square kilometers. The park was declared a national park in 1972. It went into decline due to problems caused by human settlement and lack of funds. This has resulted in little wildlife and game in the park. In July 2007, steps were taken to address these problems.

Geography
Isangano National Park spans an area of 840 square kilometers. It is located in the Luwingu and Kasama districts of the Northern Province in Zambia. Its terrain is mainly floodplain, with swampy forests and grasslands. The park is part of the Bangweulu Swamps, and it is bordered at the east by the Chambeshi River and at the west by the Bangweulu Flats. It has an altitude of 1100 meters.

History
Isangano National Park became a protected reserve in 1957. It was given national park status in 1972 under statutory order number 42. The park went into decline after being given national park status due to lack of financial support, lack of infrastructure, poaching, and illegal human settlements. In July 2007, the government of Zambia started to take steps to evict illegal settlers in the park under the Provincial Development Coordinating Committee resolution. This was done so that the park could be reestablished and restocked with wildlife.

Wildlife
There is little wildlife in Isangano National Park and little game because of the illegal human settlements and subsistence hunting by those living in the park. Besides the various migratory species and water birds that can be found in the park, other common animals found at the park are the black lechwe, reedbuck, oribi, and sitatunga.

References

National parks of Zambia
Protected areas established in 1957
Geography of Northern Province, Zambia
Tourist attractions in Northern Province, Zambia
Central Zambezian miombo woodlands